Kerstin Alexandra Kündig (born 2 July 1993) is a Swiss handballer who plays for SG BBM Bietigheim and the Switzerland women's national team.

Achievements
SPAR Premium League:
Winner: 2017, 2019
Schweizer Cupsieger:
Winner: 2016, 2017
SuperCupsieger:
Winner: 2017, 2019

References
 

  
1993 births
Living people
Sportspeople from Zürich
Swiss female handball players
Expatriate handball players
Swiss expatriate sportspeople in Germany